Douglas James Watson (born 15 May 1973) is a former South African cricketer who played domestic cricket for KwaZulu-Natal Inland. He has previously represented South Africa A, Derbyshire and Dolphins. He is also a former coach of the Dolphins.

In 2023, Watson was appointed head coach of the Scotland national cricket team on a short-term contract covering the 2023 Cricket World Cup Qualifier and 2023 Men's T20 World Cup Europe Qualifier.

References

External links
 

1973 births
Living people
Dolphins cricketers
KwaZulu-Natal cricketers
KwaZulu-Natal Inland cricketers
South African cricketers
Suffolk cricketers
Derbyshire Cricket Board cricketers
Alumni of Maritzburg College
South African cricket coaches
Coaches of the Namibia national cricket team
South African expatriate sportspeople in Namibia
Coaches of the Scotland national cricket team
South African expatriate sportspeople in Scotland
People from Pietermaritzburg